The  are an American football club based in Toulouse, Garonne, France. They have sometimes been known as Ours de Toulouse Blagnac through an association with the neighbouring city of Blagnac.
They were founded in 1986, although a precursor organization, the Toulouse Centurians, was established in 1983. They play in the Division 1 Elite Championship, the country's top level.

The club claims a French American football attendance record of 11,000 for a 1990 game against the Moscow Bears played at Toulouse Stadium.

References

External links
 Official website
 Ours de Toulouse on Twitter
 Ours de Toulouse on Facebook

American football teams in France
Sport in Toulouse
Toulouse
1986 establishments in France
American football teams established in 1986